Clear Lake, Texas can refer to:
 Clear Lake, Texas, a town in North Texas
 Clear Lake (Galveston Bay), a lake near Houston
 Clear Lake City (Greater Houston), a master-planned community that lies within Houston and Pasadena, Texas
 Clear Lake Shores, Texas
 Clear Lake (region), the cluster of communities surrounding Clear Lake